Geoffrey Arthur Barker (7 February 1949 – 14 February 2022) was an English footballer who played as a defender in the Football League for Hull City and Southend United, Darlington, Reading and Grimsby Town. Barker died on 14 February 2022, at the age of 73.

References

External links
 

1949 births
2022 deaths
English footballers
Association football defenders
English Football League players
Hull City A.F.C. players
Southend United F.C. players
Darlington F.C. players
Reading F.C. players
Grimsby Town F.C. players
Footballers from Kingston upon Hull